Byrd's Word! is an album by American jazz guitarist Charlie Byrd with tracks recorded in 1958 and released on the Riverside label in 1962. The album was first released on the Washington Records Offbeat imprint as Jazz at the Showboat

Reception

Allmusic awarded the album 4 stars stating "Byrd's Word! is an early Charlie Byrd recording that finds the guitarist in a variety of settings... Though there are really no bad cuts on the album, the content is so diverse -- acoustic trios, electric guitar with brass, and acoustic guitar with vocals -- that the album doesn't flow as a whole... The variety of material and styles gives the impression that Byrd was experimenting, but even so, his experimentation was conservative... Byrd's Word! may not be a great album, but it is certainly a good place to get a look at Byrd's early development".

Track listing
All compositions written by Bobby Felder except as indicated
 "Byrd's Word" - 5:32   
 "Blue Turning Grey Over You" (Andy Razaf, Fats Waller) - 2:55   
 "Bobby in Bassoonville" - 4:26   
 "Satin Doll" (Duke Ellington, Billy Strayhorn, Johnny Mercer) - 4:20   
 "Tri-X" - 4:29   
 "Conversation Piece" (Charlie Byrd, Keter Betts) - 3:36   
 "What's New?" (Bob Haggart, Johnny Burke) - 4:14   
 "Stompin' at the Savoy" (Benny Goodman, Chick Webb, Edgar Sampson, Razaf) - 3:21   
 "Don't Explain" (Arthur Herzog, Jr., Billie Holiday) - 3:27   
 "Buck's Hill"  - 4:37

Personnel 
Charlie Byrd - guitar
Bobby Felder - valve trombone (tracks 1, 3, 5, 7 & 10) 
Kenneth Pasmanick - bassoon (track 3)
Buck Hill - tenor saxophone (tracks 1, 5, 7 & 10)
T. Carson (tracks 1, 3, 5, 7 & 10), Charlie Schneer (track 8) - piano 
Keter Betts - bass, cello (tracks 1, 3-8 & 10)
Eddie Phyfe (tracks 4, 6 & 8) Bertell Knox (tracks 1, 3, 5, 7 & 10) - drums 
Ginny Byrd - vocals (tracks 2 & 9)

References 

1962 albums
Charlie Byrd albums
Albums produced by Orrin Keepnews
Riverside Records albums